Shan Xing is a popular Chinese Tang Dynasty poem, by Chinese poet Du Mu.

The poem

Rough translation

See also
 Tang poetry

Tang dynasty poetry